Koester is a surname. Notable people with the surname include: 

 Bev Koester (1926–1998), Canadian naval officer and civil servant
 Bob Koester (1932–2021), American music producer
 Charles Roman Koester (1915–1997), American Catholic bishop
 Hans von Koester (1844–1928), German admiral
 Helmut Koester (born 1926), American theologian
 Jolene Koester, president of California State University, Northridge

See also
Koester, Missouri
Köster